is a 2013 Japanese historical drama television series and the 52nd NHK taiga drama. Written by Mutsumi Yamamoto, the drama focuses on Niijima Yae, who is portrayed by Haruka Ayase. Yae is a strong believer in women's rights and the story follows her journey in Japan, during the time it is opened up to Western ideas.

Yae, who came from the Aizu Domain (now within Fukushima Prefecture), was chosen for the taiga drama as her story of loss and hope was felt to be timely in the aftermath of the 2011 Tōhoku earthquake and tsunami. The drama was nominated for the International Emmy Award for Best Drama Series, losing to Utopia.

Production
 Kunishirō Hayashi - Sword fight arranger

Cast
Haruka Ayase as Niijima Yae
Rio Suzuki as childhood Yae

Her family
Hidetoshi Nishijima as Yamamoto Kakuma, Yae's brother
Hiroki Hasegawa as Kawasaki Shonosuke, Yae's first husband
Joe Odagiri as Joseph Hardy Neesima, Yae's second husband
Jun Fubuki as Yamamoto Saku, Yae's mother
Yutaka Matsushige as Yamamoto Gonpachi, Yae's father
Kyōko Hasegawa as Higuchi Ura, Kakuma's first wife
Mitsuki Tanimura as Yamamoto Tokie, Kakuma's second wife
Masahiro Toda as Tokuzō, manservant of the Yamamoto family

Aizu Domain
Gō Ayano as Matsudaira Katamori, 9th daimyō of the Aizu Domain
Toshiyuki Nishida as Saigō Tanomo, chief senior counselor of the Aizu clan
Izumi Inamori as Matsudaira Teru, adoptive sister of Katamori
Ayame Goriki as Hinata Yuki, childhood friend of Yae
Meisa Kuroki as Nakano Takeko, a female swordmaster for the Aizu Domain
Takumi Saito as Jinbo Shuri, chief retainer of the Aizu domain and son of Kuranosuke
Masane Tsukayama as Jinbo Kuranosuke, chief retainer of the Aizu domain
Tetsuji Tamayama as Yamakawa Hiroshi, major general of the Imperial Japanese Army and childhood friend of Yae
Mikako Ichikawa as Yamakawa Futaba
Ryo Katsuji as Yamakawa Kenjirō
Kumiko Akiyoshi as Yamakawa En
Kiko Mizuhara as Ōyama Sutematsu
Morio Kazama as Hayashi Yasusada
Hiroyuki Ikeuchi as Kajiwara Heima
Shido Nakamura as Sagawa Kanbei
Shingo Yanagisawa as Kayano Gonbei
Shihori Kanjiya as Fujita Tokio, childhood friend of Yae
Junko Miyashita as Takagi Sumie

Tokugawa shogunate
Kotaro Koizumi as Tokugawa Yoshinobu
Takaaki Enoki as Ii Naosuke

Shinsengumi
Yū Kamio as Kondō Isami
Jun Murakami as Hijikata Toshizō
Kenji "KJ" Furuya as Saitō Hajime
Tadashi Mizuno as Nagakura Shinpachi
Shinji Suzuki as Okita Sōji

Government of Meiji
Katsuhisa Namase as Katsu Kaishū
Mitsuhiro Oikawa as Kido Takayoshi
Kazuki Kosakai as Iwakura Tomomi
Satoshi Tokushige as Ōkubo Toshimichi
Masaya Kato as Itagaki Taisuke
Takashi Sorimachi as Ōyama Iwao
Eisuke Sasai as Sanjō Sanetomi
Toranosuke Katō as Itō Hirobumi
Manabu Ino as Yamagata Aritomo

Chōshū Domain
Shun Oguri as Yoshida Shōin
Takamasa Suga as Kusaka Genzui
Hitoshi Ozawa as Sera Shūzō

Satsuma Domain
Koji Kikkawa as Saigō Takamori
Yoichi Hayashi as Shimazu Nariakira

Others
Hiroaki Murakami as Matsudaira Yoshinaga
Eiji Okuda as Sakuma Shōzan
Goro Ibuki as Tokugawa Nariaki
Kyūsaku Shimada as Maki Yasuomi 
Mitsuki Tanimura as Oda Tokie (Kakuma’s second wife)
Hiroki Matsukata as Ōgakiya Seihachi
Eric Bossick as Carl Wilhelm Heinrich Lehmann
Mayuko Kawakita as Tsuda Umeko
Ichikawa Somegorō VII as Emperor Kōmei
Kenji Masaki as Sakamoto Ryōma
Masahiro Takashima as Makimura Masanao

Production
On June 22, 2011, NHK announced that its 52nd taiga drama is titled Yae's Sakura and will be about the life of Niijima Yae, the "Jeanne d'Arc of Bakumatsu", with Mutsumi Yamamoto as writer and Katu Takō as director. The historical figure of Niijima was chosen for her story of loss and hope, along with her coming from the Aizu domain (now within the Fukushima Prefecture), to help inspire Japan after the 2011 Tōhoku earthquake and tsunami, which seriously affected Fukushima more than the other prefectures.

Music
Ryuichi Sakamoto was announced as the series' theme music composer on April 10, 2012. This is Sakamoto's first time composing music for a taiga drama.

TV schedule

Reception
In 2014, the series was nominated for the International Emmy Award for Best Drama Series.

Home media
The first 15 episodes of Yae's Sakura were released on Blu-ray on October 23, 2013. The next 16 episodes received a Blu-ray release on January 22, 2014, which includes two behind-the-scenes featurettes and the textless series intro among others. The last 19 episodes of the series were released on Blu-ray on March 19, 2014, with the release featuring cast interviews and a behind-the-scenes featurette among others. All of the Blu-ray releases are region free.

Soundtracks
NHK Taiga Drama "Yae no Sakura" Original Soundtrack I (January 30, 2013)
NHK Taiga Drama "Yae no Sakura" Original Soundtrack II (July 31, 2013)
NHK Taiga Drama "Yae no Sakura" Original Soundtrack III (November 13, 2013)
NHK Taiga Drama "Yae no Sakura" Original Soundtrack Complete Edition (January 1, 2014)

References

External links
 

Taiga drama
2013 Japanese television series debuts
2013 Japanese television series endings
Cultural depictions of Tokugawa Yoshinobu
Television series set in the 1850s
Television series set in the 1860s
Television series set in the 1870s
Television series set in the 1880s
Television series set in the 1890s
Television series set in the 1900s
Television shows set in Kyoto